The 2021 Moldovan Super Cup was the 12th Moldovan Super Cup, an annual Moldovan football match played by the winner of the national football league (the National Division) and the winner of the national Cup. The match was played between Sfîntul Gheorghe, winners of the 2020–21 Moldovan Cup, and Sheriff Tiraspol, champions of the 2020–21 National Division. It was  held at the Bălți Stadium on 26 June 2021. Sfîntul Gheorghe won 4–2 on penalties, after the match finished 2–2 after 90 minutes.

Match

Notes

References

2021–22 in Moldovan football
FC Sfîntul Gheorghe matches
FC Sheriff Tiraspol matches
Moldovan Super Cup
Association football penalty shoot-outs